Shieli is a village in Kyzylorda Region, southern-central Kazakhstan. It is the administrative centre of Shieli District and the head and the only settlement of Shieli rural district (KATO code - 435230100). Population:  

Shieli was founded in 1904 at the time of the construction of the Orenburg–Tashkent Railway.

Geography
Shieli is located by the right bank of the Syr Darya river.

References

External links

Populated places in Kyzylorda Region